Faveria nigrilinea is a species of moth in the family Pyralidae. It was described by Joseph de Joannis in 1927. It is found in Mozambique.

References

Moths described in 1927
Phycitini
Moths of Africa